Henry Leroy Finch, Jr. (August 8, 1921 – August 22, 1997) was an American scholar and professor of philosophy and a pacifist organizer.

Early life and education 
Roy Finch was born in New York City the oldest child of Henry Le Roy Finch and Mary Farquhar Baker. His grandfather was Stephen Baker, President of the Bank of the Manhattan Company. He had three brothers: Charles B. Finch Jr., Stephen Baker Finch, and John Finch.  He attended the Buckley School, Phillips Academy, and Yale University (B.A., 1940).  During World War II he registered as a conscientious objector. After the war he earned a Ph.D. in Philosophy at Columbia University, writing a dissertation on the pre-Socratic philosophers.

Career in philosophy and religion 
Finch was a professor of philosophy at Sarah Lawrence College from 1952 to 1972 and in the Department of Philosophy at Hunter College from 1973 to 1989. His eclectic awareness of the importance of a diversity of world religions, far ahead of its time, encompassed Buddhism, Confucianism, Hinduism, Judaism, and Taoism. He founded the Seminars in World Religion at Columbia University, was active in the Gurdjieff Foundation, and organized the first conference on Buddhist thinker Dogen ever held in the United States. Author of works on Ludwig Wittgenstein and Simone Weil, in 1970 he was one of the founders of the American Weil Society.

Pacifism 
Known as Roy Finch in pacifist circles, Henry Leroy Finch, Jr. was a pacifist and conscientious objector during World War II. He served in Civilian Public Service (CPS) Camp 11 (Ashburnham, Massachusetts) and Camp 37 (Coleville, California), and with CPS Unit 41 (Williamsburg, Virginia). The first two were engaged in U.S. Forest Service efforts, and the latter was a mental hospital. After the war, Finch worked as an editor for Alternative and Liberation. For a time he was involved with the American Forum for Socialist Education, but his primary affiliations were with the Fellowship of Reconciliation and War Resisters League. He hosted a pacifist radio show and involved in the formation of Public Radio in the United States and specifically WBAI Radio in New York.

Finch was known as Roy in pacifist circles during the 1940s-1950s. He hosted the War Resisters League Annual Dinners from 1955 to 1959. Honored guest speakers included Bayard Rustin, Martin Luther King Jr., and A. J. Muste.

Personal life
Finch married poet and artist Margaret Evelyn Rockwell in 1947. Their five children are Margaret (Julie) Finch, Martha Rijn Finch, Mary Dabney Baker Finch, Annie Ridley Crane Finch (Annie Finch), and Henry Leroy Finch III (Roy Finch).

Bibliography
Books

The Vision of Wittgenstein.  Vega Books, 2003.
Simone Weil and the Intellect of Grace. Ed. Martin Andic, Preface by Annie Finch. Continuum International Publishing Group Ltd., 2001
Wittgenstein (The Spirit of Philosophy). Element Books, Element Masters of Philosophy Series, 1995
Wittgenstein--The Later Philosophy: An Exposition of the "Philosophical Investigations.  New York: Humanities Press, 1977
Wittgenstein--The Early Philosophy: An Exposition of the "Tractatus.  New York: Humanities Press, 1971
Conversations With Einstein. (Ed., with Alexander Moszkowski and Henry L. Brose. New York : Horizon Press, 1970
Conversations With Tolstoi. (Ed.). New York : Horizon Press, 1968
The Complete Essays of Francis Bacon: Including the New Atlantis and Novum Organum. (Editor and Introduction). Washington Square Press, 1963
Articles
"Response to John W. Cook." Philosophical Investigations 4 (3):74-77.
"Wittgenstein’s Last Word". International Philosophical Quarterly 15 (4):383-395.

Archives
Henry L. Finch's papers on pacifism are held in the Swarthmore College Peace Collection.
His philosophical papers are included in the archive of Annie Finch in the Beinecke Rare Book and Manuscript Library at Yale University.

External links

 Roy Finch papers at Swarthmore College Peace Collection

1918 births
American pacifists
Writers from New Rochelle, New York
Phillips Academy alumni
Columbia Graduate School of Arts and Sciences alumni
Yale University alumni
American conscientious objectors
1997 deaths
20th-century American philosophers